Nez & Rio are an American record production team from Chicago, Illinois, composed of Nesbitt Wesonga Jr. and Mario Loving. They are perhaps best known for producing Schoolboy Q's 2014 single "Man of the Year," as well as ASAP Rocky's 2015 single "Lord Pretty Flacko Jodye 2". Throughout their career, they have worked with artists such as Schoolboy Q, ASAP Rocky, Vic Mensa, Arin Ray, Tinashe, Kendrick Lamar, Ab-Soul and Chance the Rapper, as well as others from their hometown Treated Crew.

History
Nez and Rio grew up together in Chicago, Illinois, attending the same elementary school and high school, as well as college at Howard University. In 2015, Nez and Rio were nominated for Best Rap Album for their work on Schoolboy Q's album Oxymoron. In late 2015, Nez and Rio announced they were working on their own project, with an album forthcoming.

Production discography

Singles
2012
 "Druggys with Hoes Again" (Schoolboy Q featuring Ab-Soul)
 "SOPA" (Ab-Soul featuring Schoolboy Q)
2014
 "Man of the Year" (Schoolboy Q)
2015
 "Lord Pretty Flacko Jodye 2" (ASAP Rocky)

2018

 "Bag Talk" (Joey Purp)

Album cuts

2010
Vic Mensa - Straight Up
03. "Lights Out"
06. "Too Hard (Lite)"

2012
Schoolboy Q - Habits & Contradictions
17. "Niggahs.already.know.davers.flow"

Tinashe - Reverie
04. "Slow"
11. "Who Am I Working For?"

King L - Drilluminati
02. "Band Nation"

2013
King L - March Madness
22. "Michael Jordan"

2014
Schoolboy Q - Oxymoron
01. "Gangsta"
15. "Fuck LA"
17. "Californication" (featuring ASAP Rocky)

2015
Tinashe - Amethyst
03. "Something to Feel"

2016
Schoolboy Q - Blank Face LP
01. "Torch"
13. "Str8 Ballin'"
17. "Tookie Knows II" (featuring Traffic and TF)

2017
Wale - Shine
09. "Fish n Grits" (featuring Travis Scott)

Awards and nominations

Grammy Awards

|-
|Oxymoron
|Best Rap Album
| 
|}

References

American hip hop DJs
Living people
American hip hop record producers
Remixers
American electronic musicians
People from Chicago
Record production duos
American songwriting teams
Record producers from Illinois
Year of birth missing (living people)